For the 1989 Eurovision Song Contest in Lausanne, the song "The Real Me", written, composed and performed by Kiev Connolly, was chosen to represent Ireland when it won the national final selection.

Before Eurovision

National final 
Held on 12 March 1989 at the Olympia Theatre in Dublin, the national final was hosted by Ronan Collins. Eight songs competed in the event, and the winner was selected by twelve members of the public.

Nicola Kerr had represented Ireland in the 1977 Eurovision Song Contest, as a member of The Swarbriggs Plus Two. That entry, "It's Nice To Be In Love Again", came in third place behind France and the United Kingdom. Linda Martin's appearance in the national final selection was her third time as a soloist, and her seventh overall. She was runner-up to Sweden in the 1984 Eurovision Song Contest, and would win the contest in 1992.

At Eurovision 
"The Real Me" was performed third in the running order on the night of the contest, following Israel and preceding Netherlands. At the close of the voting sequence, Ireland had received only 21 points, ranking them in a disappointing 18th place. At the time, this was Ireland's worst result in the contest, and would remain so until 2001.

At the Eurovision final, Collins also provided the television commentary alongside Michelle Rocca, who co-presented the Contest the previous year. Larry Gogan provided the radio commentary and Eileen Dunne was serving as spokesperson for the Irish jury.

Voting

References

1989
Countries in the Eurovision Song Contest 1989
Eurovision
Eurovision